The initials BBWR relate to two distinct Polish political organizations:

 Bezpartyjny Blok Współpracy z Rządem (Polish for "Nonpartisan Bloc for Cooperation with the Government") was an ostensibly non-political organization that existed from 1928 to 1935, closely affiliated with Józef Piłsudski and his Sanation movement.
 Bezpartyjny Blok Wspierania Reform (Polish for "Nonpartisan Bloc for Support of Reforms") was an ostensibly non-political organization (but in reality a political party) affiliated with Lech Wałęsa. It was established in 1993, and in 1997 became part of Solidarity Electoral Action.